A virtual restaurant, also known as a ghost kitchen or dark kitchen, is a food service business that serves customers exclusively by delivery and pick up based on phone and online ordering. It is a separate food vendor entity that operates out of an existing restaurant's kitchen. By not having a full-service restaurant premise with a storefront and dining room, virtual restaurants can economize by occupying cheaper real estate. The reduced space lowers overall overhead and operational costs, thus yielding higher profit margins, as the price of the food provided is typically not changed. The ghost kitchen's lack of a retail presence allows for multiple restaurants and brands to buy into it.

Background
Virtual restaurants gained significant notice during the COVID-19 pandemic in 2020, when many restaurants were either completely idled due to restrictions on public dining, or curtailed significantly as very low numbers of patrons were permitted to be served on-premises even as the situation recovered. At the same time, demand for home delivery of food expanded as people were required to stay at home. Ghost kitchens helped brick-and-mortar restaurants recoup their losses and minimize employee layoffs by allowing them to prepare food for multiple brands and keep themselves in business.

Virtual restaurants are set up within existing restaurants, allowing businesses to cut costs by sharing space. Virtual restaurants also save money by avoiding dine-in service through reliance on delivery service. Virtual restaurants rely on their own delivery drivers or third-party delivery apps such as Grubhub, Uber Eats, Postmates and DoorDash to deliver food to customers.

A typical virtual restaurant location is able to accommodate the preparation of several different types of cuisines. The strategy of having multiple brands and cuisines can target a broader range of customers. Food can be prepared by specialty chefs or any range of cooks. Virtual restaurants are intended for people looking for culinary foods and convenience, often locally or close to them.

Function
The lack of a physical brand allows companies to experiment with new menus, brands, and concepts with ease and low risk. Menus can be adjusted to match current trends or target multiple demographics with a variety of cuisines. The online nature of ghost kitchens makes it possible for virtual restaurants to track customer data and analytics through the food ordering process and make data-driven decisions. They can track the popularity of items, wait times, and customer feedback via ratings and adjust their menus accordingly.

Criticism
Ghost restaurants have been criticized for their unpleasant working conditions and cramped, windowless kitchen spaces. Several 2015 news articles found some "ghost restaurants" operated as unregulated, unlicensed standalone entities or as "fronts" for restaurants that may have health code violations.

In the United Kingdom, restaurant operators The Restaurant Group and Casual Dining Group were criticised over a lack of transparency regarding virtual restaurant brands. The companies were found to be operating several virtual brands which sold similar or identical food to their more popular high-street brands.

List of associated chain restaurants
Several virtual restaurant brands have associated brick-and-mortar locations. The following are virtual restaurants known to use ghost kitchens.

 Burger Den and Melt Down are ghost kitchen brands owned and operated by Denny's.
 Conviction Chicken is a ghost kitchen operated by TGI Fridays.
 Cosmic Wings is a ghost kitchen operated by Applebee's.
 Dockside Charlie's, Coop & Run, and Underground Chuck's are ghost kitchens operated by O'Charley's.
 Fresh Set, Chicken Sammy's, and The Wing Dept. are ghost kitchens operated by Red Robin.
 It's Just Wings and Maggiano's Italian Classics are ghost kitchens operated by Chili's.
 Pasqually's Pizza & Wings is a ghost kitchen brand owned and operated by Chuck E. Cheese.
 Rotisserie Roast is a ghost kitchen operated by Boston Market.
 Slo Roast is a ghost kitchen operated by BJ's Restaurants.
 Tender Shack is a ghost kitchen operated by Outback Steakhouse.
 Thighstop is a ghost kitchen operated by Wingstop.
 Thrilled Cheese, Super Mega Dilla, Pardon My Cheesesteak, and Tender Fix are all ghost kitchens operated by IHOP.
 Twisted Tenders and Embers BBQ are ghost kitchens operated by Logan's Roadhouse.
 Hootie's Burger Bar, Hootie's Bait and Tackle, and Hootie's Chicken Tenders are ghost kitchen brands owned and operated by Hooters.
 Wow Bao, Wingville, and Macaroniville are ghost kitchens operated by Fazoli's.
 MrBeast Burger is a ghost kitchen brand mostly running out of Buca di Beppo, Bertucci's, and Bravo! Italian Kitchens, but any restaurant can apply.

See also
 Concession stand
 Food truck
 Virtual Dining Concepts

References

Online food ordering
Restaurant terminology
Restaurants by type